Chunzeh may refer to:
 Chunzeh-ye Olya
 Chunzeh-ye Sofla